Grant Sabatier (born December 13, 1984) is an American author, podcaster, and entrepreneur. He is best known for his international bestselling book Financial Freedom which was published by Penguin Random House on February 5, 2019, and has been translated into 12 languages. Grant Sabatier founded personal finance website Millennial Money, hosts the podcast Financial Freedom, and co-founded BankBonus.com.

Life 
Grant grew up in Falls Church, VA, went to George Mason High School, and then attended the University of Chicago where he studied Philosophy. In 2010, at age 24, Sabatier was unable to find a job, so taught himself digital marketing. Several months later, Sabatier was hired at a digital marketing agency. After reading over 300 personal finance books and realizing that retirement seemed unattainable at his current salary, he quit to start a consulting business.
Despite the rapid growth of the consulting business, Sabatier consciously avoided lifestyle inflation. By saving more than 80% of his six-figure income, Sabatier amassed $1.25 million and reached financial independence by age 30.

Works

Publication 
Sabatier has written a book, Financial Freedom: A Proven Path to All the Money You Will Ever Need, which has been translated into 12 languages and is popular in the FIRE movement. The book chronicles Grant's journey to reaching financial independence at a young age and includes a step-by-step framework designed to help readers do the same. In 2020 LinkedIn Learning optioned the rights of the book and released a course designed around its content.

Podcasts 

Financial Freedom

The Financial Freedom podcast focuses on money, meaning, and everything in between. It's an interview-style podcast where Sabatier interviews guests who share strategies for mastering money and living meaningful lives.

Millennial Money Minutes

The podcast was co-hosted by Grant Sabatier, which distilled personal finance topics in five minutes.

Blog 
Millennial Money focuses on helping others "make smarter financial decisions, build more successful companies, reach financial independence and live richer lives. Millennial Money was since acquired by the Motley Fool in October 2020.

References

External links 

 Official Website
 Financial Freedom on Google Podcasts
 Financial Freedom on Apple Podcast
 Millennial Money Minutes on Google Podcasts
 Millennial Money Minutes on Apple Podcast

1984 births
Living people
American podcasters
American male bloggers
American bloggers
American financial writers
21st-century American male writers